Jamba Juice, doing business as Jamba, is an American company that produces blended fruit and vegetable juices, smoothies and similar products. The company is co-owned—with Moe's Southwest Grill, Schlotzsky's, Carvel, Cinnabon, McAlister's Deli, and Auntie Anne's brands—by Focus Brands, an affiliate of private equity firm Roark Capital Group, based in Sandy Springs, Georgia, operating over 6,000 restaurants. Jamba was founded in 1990, with the first shop located in San Luis Obispo, California. The company has more than 850 locations operating in 36 U.S. states, as well as Japan, the Philippines, Taiwan, South Korea, Thailand, and Indonesia.

History
Before the creation of the company, Jamba Juice was a "senior project" executed by Kirk Perron, an avid cyclist and healthy-lifestyle advocate, at California Polytechnic State University, San Luis Obispo (Cal Poly). Jamba Juice was founded on March 31, 1990, by Perron, who opened his first store in San Luis Obispo, California. Kevin Peters, Joe Vergara, and Linda Ozawa Olds, also helped begin the business. It was incorporated in 1990 as Juice Club, Inc. in San Luis Obispo.

Jamba Juice acquired Zuka Juice, Inc. stores on March 24, 1999. Zuka Juice was founded in Salt Lake City, Utah.

On March 13, 2006, Jamba Juice was purchased by Services Acquisition Corp. International for $265 million. A special-purpose acquisition company that was headed by Steven Berrard, the former CEO of Blockbuster Inc. 

Upon completion of the transaction, the publicly traded Services Acquisition changed its name to Jamba, Inc., and in June 2006, Jamba, Inc. announced it had completed a $35 million convertible preferred stock transaction.

The funding was led by a $19.55 million investment by Mistral Equity Partners - a private equity fund focused on consumer products and services companies. The remaining $15.45 million investment was made by a company controlled by the Serruya Family - a successful entrepreneurial Canadian-based family who founded the Yogen Früz frozen yogurt and smoothie chain.

In June 2009, Jamba began to transform the company from a smoothie shop to a food store by integrating wraps, sandwiches, and flatbreads into their menu.

In July 2009, Jamba Juice was criticized for running an advertising campaign, which was described as a "ripoff" of the work of cartoonist David Rees. The ad campaign looked similar to Rees' "Get Your War On" series. Rees was informed of the Jamba Juice ads by a fan who sent in a letter. Rees stated that "Jamba Juice bit my style, with no credit, and it's kind of disrespectful."

In May 2016, Jamba Juice announced the move of its corporate headquarters from Emeryville, California to Frisco, Texas, indicating the high costs of living and of conducting business in the San Francisco Bay Area.

On August 2, 2018, Jamba Juice announced that it would be acquired by Atlanta-based Focus Brands. The acquisition was completed on September 14, 2018.

On August 4, 2020, Jamba opened its first location in Tokyo, Japan.

Product expansion
In December 2007, it was announced that Jamba would partner with Nestlé to lend its name to a line of healthy, pre-prepared beverages under the Jamba brand. On December 19, 2008, a press release from Nestle USA and Jamba Juice announced the suspension of Jamba pre-prepared products due to "...challenges...with manufacturing on a consistent basis, resulting in inventory and out-of-stock issues."

In 2014 Jamba Juice expanded its Fresh Juice menu, and began making juices blends to order with fresh ingredients such as kale, beets and ginger.

Innovation Bar 

On November 16, 2015, Jamba, Inc. announced the construction of Jamba Juice Innovation Bar, their first concept store. Located in the center of Old Pasadena, the Innovation Bar replaced their nineteenth store, with one that was roughly double the size of a typical Jamba Juice store. Alongside the usual serving of smoothies, this location also sold many other foods, including quinoa bowls, artisan hummus toast with vegetables, homemade potato chips, and various vegan foods. It was also the first location with a WiFi dining area, where customers can watch as their beverages are prepared, or meet up with other customers. Matt Kafka, who is the Senior Director of Operations at Jamba, explained it as a "cool and hip place in Southern California". Inside, the customer is greeted with mirrored wall art with photographs of various fruits, a set of television screens showing various video greetings. Jamba opened the Innovation Bar on July 14, 2016.

On January 3, 2017, the Innovation Bar shut down and became a standard Jamba location.

See also
 Booster Juice
 Milkshake
 Orange Julius
 Robeks
 Smoothie
 Talbott Teas

References

External links

 

1990 establishments in California
2005 initial public offerings
2018 mergers and acquisitions
American companies established in 1990
Companies based in Frisco, Texas
Companies based in Sandy Springs, Georgia
Companies formerly listed on the Nasdaq
Fast-food chains of the United States
Juice bars
Restaurants established in 1990
Smoothie chains in the United States